The Minnesota Wilderness are a Tier II junior ice hockey team based in Cloquet, Minnesota, and play in the North American Hockey League (NAHL). The organization formerly fielded teams in the Canada-based Junior A Superior International Junior Hockey League for three seasons and in the American-based Tier III Minnesota Junior Hockey League.

Prior to the 2013–14 season, the Wilderness' owners bought the franchise rights to the St. Louis Bandits of the Tier II North American Hockey League, and began play for that season.

History

2000–09
The organization was founded in 2000 as the Northwest Wisconsin Knights in Spooner, Wisconsin, as a Junior B team in the Minnesota Junior Hockey League (MnJHL). In 2004, the Knights changed their name to the Wisconsin Mustangs. In 2006, the MnJHL was promoted to Tier III Junior A status by USA Hockey.
From 2001 until 2003, the Knights had an interleague relationship with the Superior International Junior Hockey League (SIJHL) of Hockey Canada. The 2009–10 season saw them back in an interlock with the SIJHL.

2010–19

On May 17, 2010, the Mustangs announced they were officially leaving the MnJHL, their players were released to a dispersal draft. Soon after they applied for entry into the SIJHL. After a couple months of petitioning USA Hockey to join a Hockey Canada-sanctioned league, they were allowed entry. The team dropped the Mustangs logo, colors, and name as the organization entered the new league as the Wisconsin Wilderness.

On September 17, 2010, the Wilderness played their first game as a full member of the SIJHL, on the road, against the Sioux Lookout Flyers, winning the game 3–2. On September 24, 2010, the Wilderness became the first American-based full membership SIJHL team to host a regular season game in the United States. The Wilderness defeated the Fort Frances Lakers 4–3. In 2011, the Wilderness won the league championship in their inaugural SIJHL season.

In the summer of 2012, the team relocated to Cloquet, Minnesota, and changed their name to the Minnesota Wilderness.

On May 4, 2013, the Wilderness became the first American team to win the Dudley Hewitt Cup by defeating the St. Michael's Buzzers 4–3 in overtime in the Central Canada final. They also became the first American team to participate in the Royal Bank Cup tournament, the Canadian National Junior A championship.

After winning the Dudley Hewitt Cup, the Wilderness announced that the 2013 Royal Bank Cup would be their final foray in Canadian junior hockey as they joined the North American Hockey League (NAHL) at the beginning of the 2013–14 season. At the Royal Bank Cup, Minnesota finished fourth in the round-robin with a 1–3 record. In the semifinal, they surrendered a 4–2 third period lead to the Alberta Junior Hockey League's Brooks Bandits to lose 5–4 in overtime. Their loss to Brooks ended their hopes of a national championship and was their final game as members of the Superior International Junior Hockey League.

In 2013, the Wilderness bought the franchise rights of the dormant St. Louis Bandits franchise to obtain entry into the NAHL.

2020–present

In July 2022, the Wilderness fired assistant coach Brendan Phelps over allegations that he solicited a 16-year-old boy for sex online. He was also temporarily suspended by the United States Center for SafeSport.

Season-by-season records

Interleague records

References

External links
Wilderness Webpage
Superior International JHL Webpage
Minnesota JHL Webpage

North American Hockey League teams
Superior International Junior Hockey League teams
Cloquet, Minnesota
2012 establishments in Minnesota
Ice hockey clubs established in 2012